The Caterham F1 Team was a Malaysian, later British owned Formula One team based in the United Kingdom which raced under a Malaysian licence.

In July 2014, Tony Fernandes and his partners announced that they had sold the team to a consortium of Swiss and Middle Eastern investors. The "Caterham" name was later used under licence after the Caterham Group separation.

In October 2014, Caterham entered administration and did not attend a race weekend for the first time in its history beginning from the United States Grand Prix. In November 2014, after also missing the Brazilian Grand Prix, Caterham became the first F1 team ever to resort to crowdfunding, enabling it to race at the final Grand Prix for 2014 and take part in end of season testing both held in Abu Dhabi. On 27 February 2015, the Fédération Internationale de l'Automobile (FIA) published a revised entry list with Manor Marussia being reintroduced and Caterham being removed from the list, and by March of the same year, the team's assets were put up for auction, spelling the official demise of the team.

History

Background

Dubbed as 1Malaysia F1, the team was operated by 1Malaysia Racing Team Sdn Bhd. The project was part of the former Prime Minister Najib Razak's 1Malaysia initiative. When Proton – the parent company of Group Lotus – terminated the licence, Fernandes acquired the privately owned Team Lotus name for use in the  season. As Proton began legal proceedings against the team, Fernandes acquired Caterham Cars. In November 2011, the team applied to the Formula One commission to formally change their constructor name for the  season from Lotus to Caterham, while Renault changed their name to Lotus. Permission was granted before being formally ratified at a meeting of the FIA World Motor Sport Council. The team finished 10th in the Constructors' Championship in 2011, with three 13th-place finishes (two from Trulli, one from Kovalainen).

2012 season

Trulli and Kovalainen re-signed with the team, under its new guise of Caterham, for the  season.

On 18 January 2012, it was announced that the team would be moving to the Leafield Technical Centre in Leafield, Oxfordshire, the previous headquarters of both Arrows and Super Aguri F1 teams. The Caterham CT01 was the first car the team had built to run KERS.

On 17 February, the team announced that Vitaly Petrov would replace Trulli alongside Kovalainen for the 2012 season. Mark Smith took over pitwall operations from Group CTO Mike Gascoyne starting from the Chinese Grand Prix.

The Caterham car looked slower than expected at the beginning of the season. Kovalainen again made it into the second part of qualifying, in Valencia, qualifying 16th for the race, after eliminating both Toro Rossos and title contender Mark Webber with the final lap of the first session. Caterham continued their good form into the race with both Kovalainen and Petrov running well until Kovalainen collided with Toro Rosso's Jean-Éric Vergne. The incident caused a safety car, but Kovalainen recovered to finish 14th behind Petrov, who managed what was at this point the team's joint best finish in 13th. The team then went on to secure 10th place in the Constructors' Championship, pipping Marussia at the final post, after a hard last race where Vitaly Petrov achieved a team record-breaking 11th-place finish in front of Charles Pic while Kovalainen finished in 14th behind STR-Ferrari's Daniel Ricciardo.

2013 season

On 23 November 2012, it was announced that Marussia driver Charles Pic signed a multi-year contract with the team and his teammate was rookie Giedo van der Garde. On 1 March 2013, the team announced that Alexander Rossi and Ma Qinghua would be its reserve drivers for the 2013 season.

On 17 April 2013, it was confirmed that the team had re-signed Heikki Kovalainen as a reserve driver (formal technical development role) in order to test their upgrades. Ma Qinghua consequently lost his reserve driver seat. At the 2013 Belgian Grand Prix, Giedo van der Garde achieved Caterham's best ever qualifying position with 14th place. Despite having a faster car than rivals Marussia, Caterham finished behind them on the Constructors' Championship finishing 11th.

2014 season

On 21 January 2014, it was announced that the team would have a brand new driver line-up with Marcus Ericsson and Kamui Kobayashi taking the seats. Team owner Fernandes warned team members that he would quit if results did not improve in the 2014 season. After the 2014 Monaco Grand Prix, Caterham became the record holders for the most race starts without scoring a single point, after fellow rivals Marussia scored their first points finish since entering the sport in 2010, courtesy of the 9th-place finish from Jules Bianchi.

In July 2014, Caterham F1 announced that it was now owned by a consortium of Swiss and Middle Eastern investors, advised by former F1 Team Principal Colin Kolles. Former Dutch F1 driver, Christijan Albers, assisted by Manfredi Ravetto, became responsible for the day-to-day running of the team. In his place, former Jaguar F1 test driver and three-time 24 Hours of Le Mans winner, André Lotterer, made his début in Formula One. He retired early from the race due to mechanical issues and turned down the chance to further race for Caterham, or in Formula One unless under better conditions.

Administration
On 21 October 2014, it was announced that Caterham had entered administration, and had withdrawn its management team. A statement issued on behalf of Caterham said that the administrators, Smith & Williamson, were now in control of the team. Bernie Ecclestone gave Caterham special dispensation to miss the United States and Brazilian Grands Prix while they attempted to find a buyer for the team.

In spite of the above dispensation, absence from any Grand Prix breached Formula One regulations. Nevertheless, at the United States Grand Prix, because of the team's current financial circumstances – similar to those of Marussia F1 – the FIA stewards decided to not impose any penalties. Instead, they referred the matter to the attention of the FIA president. In addition, for 2015, Sauber announced the engagement of Caterham's driver, Marcus Ericsson, who terminated his contract with Caterham on 12 November 2014.

Return to racing
On 5 November 2014, the FIA released the provisional 2015 entry list which included Caterham, who were listed as CF1 Caterham F1 Team. During the same week, it was also revealed that the team had arranged a surprise 3-race deal with Rubens Barrichello who last raced in 2011 and would have taken over Kobayashi's seat for the remainder of the 2014 season.

During the 2014 Brazilian Grand Prix weekend, Caterham's administrators resorted to crowdfunding in order to keep the team's chances of a return to the sport alive, much to the dismay of some Formula One personalities including Bernie Ecclestone. On 14 November 2014, it was reported that Caterham had succeeded in raising the necessary funds, via the crowdfunding initiative, to compete at the final Grand Prix of the  season in Abu Dhabi. In contrast to multi-national logos adorning other team cars, according to media reports, a crowdfunding on-car sponsor for Caterham was a small UK pub: the Windmill Inn in Littleworth, West Sussex.

On 16 November 2014, it was announced by Caterham that Kobayashi would drive for the team in Abu Dhabi, and, on 20 November, that the second driver would be 23-year-old British driver, Will Stevens who had previously tested for the team and would also take part in post-season testing also at Abu Dhabi, immediately after the race weekend.

On 1 December 2014, it was announced that the team had received special dispensation to use their 2014 cars in the  season, which would assist the administrator in finding a buyer for the team. Despite this, the team's assets were sold by auction, starting March 2015, meaning that attempts to race in 2015 had failed. The team then officially folded.

Staff controversies
On 25 July 2014, it was announced that over forty former employees were taking legal action against the team for unfair dismissal, following a number of cost cuts by Caterham F1's new owners.

In November 2014, despite Caterham F1 returning to racing under the control of its administrator following a successful crowdfunding initiative, 230 staff members not directly involved in Grand Prix preparations were made redundant.

The staff that were redundant received a redundancy payment in January 2019, over four years after the team was declared bankrupt.

Complete Formula One results
(key)

Driver development program 
During Caterham's time in F1, the team supported multiple drivers through the Caterham Racing Team in the GP2 Series and gave them the opportunity to participate in Formula One test sessions. Giedo van der Garde and Will Stevens were the only drivers of the program to compete for the team in F1. The drivers included:

Former drivers

References

External links

F1 Team
Formula One constructors
Formula One entrants
Formula One controversies
Malaysian auto racing teams
2012 establishments in Malaysia
2014 disestablishments in Malaysia
Companies based in Oxfordshire
Companies that have entered administration in the United Kingdom
Tune Group
Auto racing teams established in 2012
Auto racing teams disestablished in 2014